Nora Aunor is a Filipino actress, recording artist, and film producer who has worked in theatre, radio, television, concerts and film.

She started her career as a singer and eventually tried her luck on movies. She made more than 175 movies in the span of more than 45 years. She is the only actress of her generation to have been directed by four National Artists for film Awardees, Gerardo de Leon, Lamberto Avellana, Lino Brocka, and Ishmael Bernal. As an actress, she is regarded as one of the best in the business because of the quality movies, television shows and stage plays that she appeared in. She was named by YES! Magazine as one of the "Philippines' 15 Best Actresses of All Time" in 2004,S Magazine named her as the "Philippines' Best Actress of All Time" in 2006, and in 2010, she was hailed by the Green Planet Movie Awards as one of the "10 Asian Best Actresses of the Decade".

Filmography

1960-1970s

1980-1990s

2000-2020s

Television

Stage

Films adapted to stage plays

As a producer

Movies

Television

As a director

Film

See also
List of awards and nominations received by Nora Aunor

References

External links
Nora-icon
The Artistry of Nora Aunor

Aunor, Nora
Philippine filmographies
Nora Aunor